This is a list of cricketers who played for Kent county cricket teams in first-class cricket matches before the formation of the first Kent County Cricket Club in August 1842.

Cricket is generally believed to have originated out of children's bat and ball games in the areas of the Weald and North and South Downs in Kent and Sussex. The two counties and Surrey were the first centres of the game and the first known inter-county match took place between a Kent side and one from Surrey on Dartford Brent in 1709. Matches played by teams using the name Kent continued throughout the 18th century, and matches by the side have been considered first-class from 1773.

Although there were attempts to form County Clubs at Coxheath in 1787 and at Town Malling between 1835 and 1841, both of these ultimately failed and the first Kent County Cricket Club was established out of the Beverley Cricket Club during Canterbury Cricket Week in 1842. The new club played its first first-class match against an England side at White Hart Field in Bromley on 25–27 August 1842.

This list includes those who played for Kent sides in matches which have been given first-class status before the match at Bromley in August 1842. Many players appeared for other teams, including the East and West Kent cricket teams and the amateur Gentlemen of Kent side, but only those who played for Kent sides have been included here.

A

B

C

D

E

F

G

H

J

K

L

M

N

O

P

R

S

T

U

V

W

Y

See also
 List of Kent County Cricket Club players
 List of Gentlemen of Kent cricketers

Notes

References

Bibliography
Birley D (1999) A Social History of English Cricket. London: Aurum Press. 
Buckley GB (1935) Fresh Light on 18th Century Cricket. Birmingham: Cotterell & Co. 
Carlaw D (2020) Kent County Cricketers A to Z. Part One: 1806–1914 (revised edition). (Available online at the Association of Cricket Statisticians and Historians. Retrieved 2020-12-21.)
Denison WD (1846) Cricket: Sketches of the Players. London: Simpkin, Marshall and Co.
Lucas EV ed (1907) The Hambledon Men. London: Henry Frowde. (Available online at Wikisource. Retrieved 2022-03-20.) Includes:
Nyren J The Cricketers of My Time, pp. 42–93.
Pycroft J The Hambledon Club and the Old Players pp. 133–157.
Haygarth A Memoirs of the Old Players, pp. 185–219.
Midwinter E (2017) Class Peace: An Analysis of Social Status and English Cricket 1846–1962. Nottingham: Association of Cricket Statisticians and Historians. 
Milton H (1999) The Bat & Ball Gravesend: a first-class history. Gravesend: Gravesend Cricket Club. 
Milton H (2020) Kent County Cricket Grounds. Worthing: Pitch Publishing. 
Moore D (1988) The History of Kent County Cricket Club. London: Christopher Helm. 
Mote A (1997) The Glory Days of Cricket: The Extraordinary Story of Broadhalfpenny Down. London: Robson. (Available online. Retrieved 2022-03-25.)
Rajan A (2011) Twirlymen: The Unlikely History of Cricket's Greatest Spin Bowlers. London: Yellow Jersey Press. 
Underdown D (2000) Start of Play: Cricket and Culture in Eighteenth-Century England. London: Penguin Books. 

Kent county cricketers to 1842
Kent county cricketers to 1842